Blues at Sunrise may refer to:
 Blues at Sunrise (Albert King album)
 Blues at Sunrise (Stevie Ray Vaughan album)